Johannes Wolf (17 April 1869 – 25 May 1947) was a German musicologist, archivist and teacher, known for his research on medieval and Renaissance music, particularly Ars Nova, and early music notation.

Born in Berlin, Wolf studied music history under Philip Spitta and Heinrich Bellermann at the Friedrich Wilhelm University. He completed his doctorate at the Berlin University in 1902.

Wolf is viewed as one of the last great universal musicologists of the twentieth century, his published researches and editions ranging from the Middle Ages to the Romantic period. He devoted particular attention to music of the Reformation, the history of music theory and the interpretation of Ars Nova notation. He died in Munich aged 78.

Selected publications 
Geschichte der Mensural-Notation von 1250–1460. Leipzig 1904
Handbuch der Notationskunde. 2 vol. Leipzig 1913–1919
Geschichte der Musik in allgemeinverständlicher Form. 3 vol., Leipzig 1925–1929
Musikalische Schrifttafeln. Bückeburg/Leipzig 1927

References

External links 
 

20th-century German musicologists
1869 births
1947 deaths
Humboldt University of Berlin alumni
Musicologists from Berlin